The USCGC Sapelo (WPB-1314) is an Island class cutter, operated by the United States Coast Guard.
In 2013, unlike other Island class cutters, she was not commanded by a commissioned officer, she was commanded by a Chief Warrant Officer.

In 2013 the Sapelo seized a shipment of 1.3 tons of cocaine, estimated to be worth $34 million United States dollars.

In June 2015, the Homer News reported that a sister ship of Sapelo, Roanoke Island, stationed in Homer, Alaska, was being retired.
They reported that, since the Sapelo had been replaced by a new Sentinel class cutter, she would be brought to Homer to replace Roanoke Island.  The previous crew of Roanoke Island would then cross-deck to Sapelo in a crew swap.

Design
The Island-class patrol boats were constructed in Bollinger Shipyards, Lockport, Louisiana. It is powered two Paxman Valenta 16 CM diesel engines or two Caterpillar 3516 diesel engines. It has two  3304T diesel generators made by Caterpillar; these can serve as motor–generators. Its hull is constructed from highly strong steel, and the superstructure and major deck are constructed from aluminium.

It is fitted with one  machine gun and two  M60 light machine guns; it may also be fitted with two Browning .50 Caliber Machine Guns. It is fitted with satellite navigation systems, collision avoidance systems, surface radar, and a Loran C system. Its complement is sixteen (two officers and fourteen crew members). Island-class patrol boats are based on Vosper Thornycroft  patrol boats and have similar dimensions.

References

Sapelo
Ships built in Lockport, Louisiana